Gattu is 2012 Hindi film directed by Rajan Khosa..

Gattu may refer to:

 Gattu Ramachandra Rao, Indian politician
 Gattu, the mascot for Asian Paints Ltd created by cartoonist R. K. Laxman in 1954.